The Avro 566 Avenger was a prototype British fighter of the 1920s, designed and built by Avro. It was a single-seat, single-engine biplane of wood and fabric construction. Although it was a streamlined and advanced design, it never entered production.

Development
The Avenger was designed as a private venture and Roy Chadwick penned a machine of great aerodynamic cleanliness for its time. As originally built, it was powered by a 525 hp (391 kW) Napier Lion VIII and it first flew on 26 June 1926, but no order was forthcoming; this was partly because by the time it was evaluated, the Air Ministry did not favour the Lion as a fighter engine.

In May 1928, the machine was modified as a racer, with equi-span wings of 28 ft (8.53 m) and revised struts and ailerons; it was fitted with a 553 hp (412 kW) Lion. The machine was subsequently redesignated Avro 567 Avenger II.

The Avenger ended its days as an instructional airframe.

Specifications (Avenger)

References

External links

 Avro Avenger – British Aircraft Directory

1920s British fighter aircraft
Avenger
Single-engined tractor aircraft
Biplanes